Flowers Wood is a community woodland near Ilmington in Warwickshire, England. It is owned and managed by the Woodland Trust. It was one of 200 "Woods on Your Doorstep" created by the Woodland Trust to mark the year 2000 in conjunction with the Millennium Commission, the Forestry Commission and the Sainsbury Family Charitable Trusts.

References

Forests and woodlands of Warwickshire